Calamotropha doii is a moth in the family Crambidae. It was described by Sasaki in 1997. It is found in Japan (Honshu).

References

Crambinae
Moths described in 1997